Pietro Longo (born 29 October 1935) is an Italian politician.

Longo was born in Rome. His mother, Rosetta Longo, from Campobasso, was a  member of the Italian Socialist Party (Partito Socialista Italiano; PSI). Longo studied social sciences, and was one of the founder of the Censis (Italian Census Institute).

On 20 October 1978 he became secretary of the Italian Democratic Socialist Party (Partito Socialista Democratico Italiano; PSDI). He was confirmed as secretary in the party's 18th congress, held in Rome in February 1980, and in the 19th, held in Milan in March 1982. Longo was also minister for Economic Balance in Bettino Craxi's first cabinet.

In 1984 he had to resign first from his government position, and later (1985) as secretary, after the Loggia P2 scandal, whose list of members had included him since 1981. He was succeeded as PSDI secretary by Franco Nicolazzi. He failed to be elected to Parliament in the 1987 general election and lost judicial immunity. Longo thus underwent trial for the ICOMEC bribe scandal, being condemned in first (1989), second (1991) and third (1992) grade. The last condemnation caused him to be imprisoned in Rome's Rebibbia jail. In the meantime Longo had entered the PSI in 1989.

References

1935 births
Living people
Politicians from Rome
Italian Socialist Party politicians
Italian Democratic Socialist Party politicians
20th-century Italian politicians